The Professional Chess Association of the Philippines (PCAP) is a professional chess league in the Philippines.

History
The Professional Chess Association of the Philippines (PCAP) was formed by Filipino lawyer Paul Elauria who also became the league's first commissioner. The league was launched in 2020, although plans relating to the establishment of the first professional chess league in the Philippines has already been made years ago.

It was formed as a means of livelihood for Filipino chess players, since not all are part of the Philippine national team. It is reportedly the first professional chess league in Southeast Asia with its first season to be held in 2021 with games possibly to be held online due to the COVID-19 pandemic. The league was recognized by the Games and Amusements Board (GAB), a government body which regulates professional sports in the Philippines, in September 2020. PCAP held its first national try out online through on October 17, 2020.

For the inaugural season slated to start early 2021, 24 teams will participate in the league. The first ever draft was held on December 20, 2020.

In March 2021, PCAP secured a sponsorship of the San Miguel Corporation.

Teams
There are 20 teams in the PCAP as of the 2023 season divided into two geographic groups.

North
Laguna Heroes (Cabuyao)
Cagayan Kings
Cavite Spartans (General Trias)
Isabela Knights of Alexander
Mandaluyong Tigers
Manila Indios Bravos
Pasig City King Pirates
Quezon City Simba's Tribe
Rizal Batch Towers
San Juan Predators

South
Camarines-Iriga 
Cebu City Machers
Davao Chess Eagles
Iloilo Kisela Knights
Mindoro Tamaraws
NIR Kingsmen
Surigao Fianchetto Checkmates
Tacloban Vikings
Toledo City Trojans
Zamboanga Sultans

Former teams
Antipolo Cobras
Cagayan De Oro
Caloocan Loadmanna Knights
Cordova Dutchess Dagami Warriors
Lapu-Lapu City Naki Warriors 
Olongapo Rainbow Team 7
Pagadian PCL
Palawan Queens' Gambit

Format

Tournaments
The PCAP will have three tournaments or conference in each season namely the All-Filipino, Reinforced and Open Conferences. Participating teams will be geographic-based, and will represent a particular local government unit although all teams will be privately owned. The participating teams will be divided into two geographic conferences or groups, North and South with teams initially playing other sides within their respective groups before playing against each other in inter-league matches in the elimination round.

Conferences (Tournaments)

All-Filipino
Reinforced
Open

Players
Teams can have eight to ten players under contract; six of them being regular players. Among the regular players two must be rated players, one must be female, one must be senior and two must be homegrown players. All participating players including participants of the PCAP draft must be licensed by the Games and Amusements Board (GAB). A salary cap is imposed to protect the financial viability of the league. For the Reinforced conference, each team can field on foreign player who may fill a slot in all categories except the homegrown category. A rated player may not be recategorized as a homegrown player.

Matches
Each match in the PCAP include seven boards:

In a conference, each team play against other teams within their group twice, and once against teams outside their group.

See also
Filipino Chess Championship

References

External links

Chess organizations
Chess in the Philippines
2020 establishments in the Philippines
Sports leagues established in 2020
Chess competitions
Professional sports leagues in the Philippines